A count room or counting room is a room that is designed and equipped for the purpose of counting large volumes of currency. Count rooms are operated by central banks and casinos, as well as some large banks and armored car companies that transport currency.

A count room may be divided into two separate areas, one for counting banknotes (sometimes referred to as soft count) and one for counting coins (sometimes referred to as hard count). Some high-volume cash businesses, especially casinos, will operate two distinct rooms.

Surveillance
Most count rooms are equipped with closed-circuit television cameras and sometimes sound recording equipment to assist in detecting theft, fraud, or collusion among the count room personnel.

References

Banking terms
Rooms
Casinos